Strumaria salteri is a species of flowering plant in the family Amaryllidaceae, native to the Cape Provinces of South Africa, where it is found in seasonally moist sandstone outcrops. It has a loose inflorescence with pinkish flowers, the colour coming from the midribs of the tepals, similar to Strumaria gemmata. It was first described by Winsome Fanny Barker in 1944.

References

salteri
Flora of the Cape Provinces
Plants described in 1944